The Paul Schmitt P.S.7 (company designation of B.R.A.H. (Bomber Renault Aile Haute) - High wing Renault bomber) was a French World War I two-seat biplane bomber that dispensed with the novel variable incidence wing used on prior designs.

Design
The P.S.7 was an oversized, three bay biplane, developed from the preceding Paul Schmitt Aerobus. Each wing bay was divided by addition braces in the same manner as the SPAD VII so as to look like a 6 bay biplane. Its fuselage consisted of a fabric-covered wooden frame, while the flying surfaces were similarly constructed. The engine was mounted on a metal mount, covered with metal panels and equipped with a frontal radiator. The pilot and observer were placed behind the wings, while the fuel and oil tanks were located ahead of the pilot, directly behind the  Renault 12 engine.

The undercarriage was built of tubular steel, the wheels attached to a fixed horizontal axle. The armament consisted of a synchronized machine gun for the pilot and a second machine gun for the observer. Mountings for 150 kg bombs were mounted under the wings.

Operational history
The "Groupe de bombardement 3" (GB.3) - a bomb squadron of the four Escadrilles PS.125-128, which operated on the Western Front was equipped with the aircraft. The aircraft of the last delivery series, which went to the Escadrille PS.128, received an undercarriage with four wheels to improve the ground handling.

At the time of delivery to the escadrilles of the Aéronautique Militaire, the PS-7, constructed in 1915, was already obsolete. Their low speed made the slow and lumbering craft an easy target for enemy antiaircraft guns and fighters. Re-equipping with the more powerful 265 hp Renault engine could not sufficiently alleviate these shortcomings. The P.S.7 were therefore mainly used as a night bomber against long-range targets such as railroad stations and supply depots, as on 13./14. April 1917 against the railway stations in Marl and Crécy-sur-Serre and on 2 May against a German airfield near Saint-Quentin.

The oversized aircraft proved to be so difficult to control that accurately hitting targets was extremely difficult. In addition, the engine proved to be unreliable, so that the operational strength of the squadron temporarily dropped to only twelve machines. The crews now often took with them another Lewis machine gun and additional ammunition for defense, which further reduced the bomb load to 90 kg. Only on the express command of the High Command were further attacks by the squadron carried out. The last major attack was carried out on October 20, 1917. After that, more long-range missions due to the threat of German fighters and enemy anti-aircraft artillery was no longer possible. The remaining PS-7 GB.3 were replaced by January 1918 in the front line by Sopwith 1½ Strutter and Breguet 14s and transferred to training units.

Specifications

See also

References

Citations

Bibliography

1910s French bomber aircraft
Biplanes
Military aircraft of World War I
Aircraft first flown in 1915
Paul Schmitt aircraft
Single-engined tractor aircraft